Jack Graham (born 25 February 1998) is a professional Australian rules footballer playing for the Richmond Football Club in the Australian Football League (AFL). Graham is a two-time premiership player, having featured in grand final wins for Richmond in both 2017 and 2020. As a junior he captained South Australia at the 2016 AFL Under 18 Championships and won the Larke Medal as the competition's best player. After being drafted by Richmond in the third round of the 2016 draft, he made his debut in round 22 of the 2017 season, before becoming a premiership player in just his fifth career AFL game. He is a co-holder of the AFL record for most tackles on debut.

Early life and junior football
Graham spent his formative years in the North eastern Adelaide suburb of Greenwith. 

Graham participated in the Auskick program at Golden Grove and played junior football with Tea Tree Gully in the North Eastern Metro Junior Football Association. He later joined North Adelaide's development program at age 12 where he began playing representative junior football.

In 2013 he captained the under 15s South Australian representative schoolboys team at the year's national championships. The following year he captained the premiership winning South Australian side at the Under 16 national championships.

Graham made his SANFL senior debut with North Adelaide in June 2015. He had 15 possessions in the match, along with six marks, three tackles and two clearances. That year he was also selected to play for his state at the under 18 national championships as a bottom aged player. He finished the tournament having played two matches.

In the 2015/16 off-season Graham was a member of the 33-man AFL Academy squad. As part of the program he spent a fortnight training with the AFL's  in December 2015. He also joined the other members of the elite group in a training camp in Melbourne and another in the United States. A quad injury sustained during this period however, saw his summer partially interrupted.

In 2016 Graham was selected to represent and captain the South Australian side at the national under 18s carnival. He was named among his state's best players in three of his four games at the tournament His 25 disposals and five clearances per game both lead the competition while his 11 contested possessions saw him rank second. Graham also averaged 318 metres gained in his four matches at the carnival. Graham was awarded the Larke Medal as the competition's best player, becoming the first South Australian to do so in 14 years. He was later named in the competition's All Australian team and received South Australia's most valuable player award.

At state level he also performed strongly that year, averaging 24 disposals per game in the SANFL under 18s through the start of June 2016. A quad injury saw Graham miss the club's finals campaign however and prematurely ended his final season at junior level.

AFL recruitment
Graham was invited to attend the national draft combine in Melbourne in October 2016. He did not complete physical testing, however, due to a strained quadriceps muscle.

South Australian junior high performance manager Brenton Phillips likened to Graham to 's Luke Hodge, saying he was a "really hard, inside, contested-ball winner who probably spreads a bit harder than Hodge."

By the time the national draft came around in late November, Graham's stock had dropped considerably. While the Herald projected Graham in the range 15 to 25, Fox Sport's Ben Waterworth was less confident, citing injuries and poor kicking as reasons for a late second or third round projection. ESPN's Christopher Doerre also had Graham as likely second or third round pick while he was ranked 42nd in Draft Central's projections. He was projected to be selected at pick 23 and pick 24 by AFL Media's Callum Twomey and The Age's Emma Quayle respectively in their draft day phantom drafts.

Junior statistics

Under 18 National Championships

|- style="background-color: #EAEAEA"
! scope="row" style="text-align:center" | 2016
|South Australia
| 16 || 4 || 1 || — || 54 || 46 || 100 || 12 || 17 || 0.3 || — || 13.5 || 11.5 || 25.0 || 3.0 || 4.3
|-
|- class="sortbottom"
! colspan=3| Career
! 4
! 0
! —
! 54
! 46
! 100
! 12
! 17
! 0.3
! —
! 13.5
! 11.5
! 25.0
! 3.0
! 4.3
|}

AFL career

2017 season
In the weeks following the draft, Richmond recruiting manager Matthew Clarke cited Graham's defensive running as a key reason for his selection in addition to his on-ball prowess.

He trained under a limited program in the 2017 pre-season due to the effects of hamstring tendinitis. Graham remained in the clubs injury rehab ground until early March as a result of the injury, failing to play in the club's JLT Community Series campaign. He suffered a further injury setback that month when he fractured his ankle during a club training session. In late June he was removed from the club's long-term injury list and played his first half of football with the club's reserves side in the VFL. Graham sustained a further ankle injury after one half of VFL play in mid-July. He did not return to the match after a first half in which he recorded a stunning 21 disposals, 14 contested possessions, eight clearances and six tackles. He recovered from the injury after missing one match and returned to VFL football in late July.

He finally made his senior debut in round 22 of the 2017 AFL season in an away match against  at Domain Stadium. He kicked a goal in the match, along with recording 13 disposals and laying a game-high 11 tackles. In doing so he equaled Rupert Wills' VFL/AFL record for the most tackles recorded on debut. He kicked another goal the following week, before lining up in Richmond's qualifying final where he laid six tackles in the first quarter and finished with an equal club-high nine tackles for the match. By his fifth match he was lining up in Richmond's Grand Final side, being the youngest player in either of the Richmond or  teams. After Crows midfielder Rory Sloane kicked two goals and was influential in the first half, Graham was tasked with a run-with role on him for the remainder of the match. Sloane failed to score again and recorded only six disposals from that point forward. When Richmond defeated the Crows by 48 points, Graham became a 2017 premiership player. He finished the match with a game-high three goals as well as 16 disposals and was one of only six players from either side to receive votes for the best on ground award, the Norm Smith Medal.

2018 season

During the 2017/18 off-season Graham received life membership to Richmond for his premiership-winning appearance the previous year, despite having played just five AFL matches. He also signed a new two-year contract extension, seeing him secured to the club until the end of the 2020 season. When the new season began Graham found himself right back into the Richmond best-22, making his season debut in round 1's opening match against . Graham repeated the negating role he had been used in during the grand final the previous year, this time being switched onto Patrick Cripps in an attempt to quell the young star's influence after half-time. He laid a game-high 13 tackles in Richmond's 26-point win and recorded 106 pressure points, the sixth most by any player in the history of the statistic. In round 4 Graham set a then season-best mark with 17 disposals but attracted a report for rough conduct against the 's Dayne Zorko when he attempted to push Zorko out of a kick and hit him with a forearm to the head. The incident was graded by the AFL's match review officer as intentional conduct with low impact to the head and Graham was subsequently offered a one match ban. Graham and the club elected to challenge that decision however, taking the case to the AFL's Tribunal on the grounds that the hit was careless and not intentional. The appeal was unsuccessful and Graham's one-match suspension was upheld. To that point he was oddsmakers' sixth favourite to take the league's Rising Star award despite not having been nominated and was ruled ineligible to win the award as result of the suspension incurred. At the end of round 4 he was ranked number one at the club and third in the league for pressure acts applied per game. He received one vote in the Coaches Association Player of the Year tally for that performance in which he also laid seven tackles and kicked his first goal of the season. To the end of round 8 Graham was ranked fifth in the competition for average pressure points applied per game (62.4). He did not play at VFL level that weekend either, in what would effectively serve as a one-week rest before he was recalled to AFL football in round 13. Scans would reveal he had sustained some anterior labral damage in the dislocation and club officials confirmed he was set to miss up to a month of football despite avoiding the need for immediate surgery to repair the joint. He earned praise from  Damien Hardwick for that performance with the coach saying Graham was "such an important player to us. His pressure points are high [and] he makes other players around him better". He also received a two thousand dollar fine from the AFL's Match Review Officer for striking opposition defender Dale Morris during the match. Graham finished the regular season averaging 62 pressure points per game, good for third best in the league behind only Dayne Zorko and league-leader Devon Smith. Graham finished the year having played 18 matches while leading the club for both total tackles and average tackles per game that season.

2019 season

Graham spent the early part of the 2018/19 off-season rehabbing from shoulder surgery required to fully repair the joint he had dislocated in the later part of the 2018 season. Though he had resumed running by the beginning of the pre-season training period, he would be held out from contact drills until February. He remained at AFL level for a further three matches before being dropped to the VFL after 14 disposals in round 4's match against . In the opening minutes of his first reserves-grade match of the year, Graham suffered a minor hamstring injury that would see him miss the remainder of that contest as well each of the next three matches. He returned to VFL football with two goals in the Dreamtime match in late May, before posting 24 disposals and 10 tackles the following week and earning himself a round 12 AFL recall. Despite that output Graham was dropped from AFL level in round 17 but also held out from VFL gameplay. He returned immediately in round 18's win over  before equaling a then-career best with 13 tackles against  in round 19. To that point he ranked third among all players in the league for tackles per game that season. His performance earned him selection in AFL Media's Team of the Week while his tackle count set a new personal best and equaled a club record. Graham suffered a dislocated right shoulder early in the first quarter of Richmond's preliminary final a fortnight later, spending 20 minutes off the field receiving treatment before returning to the field against the expectations of club staff in the later stages of the match. His side eventually made a second-half comeback to win the game and earn a grand final birth, with coach Damien Hardwick saying Graham's effort to return "was simply incredible" and that his tenacity to play on would be remembered as a significant "chapter in (Richmond's) history. In the days that followed, Graham underwent treatment and rehabilitation on the shoulder in an attempt to be fit to play in the grand final, with Trent Cotchin optimistically telling media that the "shoulder probably isn't as bad as (club medical staff) expected". Despite this, Graham was ruled out from the final after a training session early that week. Graham meanwhile, was one of just six players on the Richmond list to play in neither the AFL nor VFL premiership winning sides that season. At the conclusion of the season, his 113 tackles earned him second place at the club behind Dion Prestia and landed him fifth overall on the club record books for most tackles in a season. Graham was a co-winner of the Francis Bourke award as voted by his peers and placed equal 16th at the club's best and fairest count that year.

2020 season
After off-season shoulder surgery, Graham returned to pre-season training on a light program of conditioning and strength work in early December 2019. After missing match-simulation sessions in early February, Graham returned to full contact training in the middle of that month with a targeted return to top-level match-play for the club's final pre-season game. While he missed this target, he did manage to participate in a VFL practice match in the first week March and was scheduled to play in another the following week that was eventually cancelled due to safety concerns as a result of the rapid progression of the coronavirus pandemic into Australia. Graham was recalled to AFL level when the season began a week later, and recorded eight disposals in a win over  that was played without crowds in attendance due to public health prohibitions on large gatherings. In what was the first of what the league planned would be a reduced 17-round season, the match was also played with quarter lengths reduced by one fifth in order to reduce the physical load on players who would be expected to play multiple matches with short breaks in the second half of the year. Just three days later, the AFL Commission suspended the season for an indefinite period after multiple states enforced quarantine conditions on their borders that effectively ruled out the possibility of continuing the season as planned. Graham contributed 14 disposals in a draw with  when the season resumed in mid-June after an 11-week hiatus. He went without a tackle for the first time in his career during a loss to  the following week, before being omitted from the club's round 4 side. He played reserves football in an unofficial scratch match against 's reserves that week due to the pandemic-related cancellation of the VFL season, where he contributed 11 tackles in an exceptional midfield performance. He received three coaches award votes for recording 16 disposals and a game-high seven inside-50s in that match, which was played on the Gold Coast after Richmond and all other Victorian-based clubs were relocated following a virus outbreak in Melbourne. Graham notched a personal season-best 23 disposals in an impressive performance against  one week later, receiving a five coaches award votes as third-best on ground in a win that also included five inside 50s and four clearances. After a season in which he played 16 of a possible 21 matches, Graham also placed 11th in the club's best and fairest count.

2021 season
Graham played his first football of 2021 in the club's unofficial practice match against  in February and in the club's sole official pre-season contest against  in March. He was a stand-out player in round 1, recording career-high tallies for disposals (33), inside-50s (11) and metres gained (836) to earn coaches votes as the second best player in the game behind only Dustin Martin. In doing so he became just the third player in league history (after Gary Ablett Jr. and Cyril Rioli to record two or more matches with 12 tackles and three goals.

Player profile
Graham plays as a half-forward and inside midfielder, and is adept at his ability to spread away from the contest to clear the ball from contested situations. He is particularly notable for the defensive aspects of his game, including his ability to apply pressure in midfield contests and to lay tackles. In his first two seasons he was also used sporadically as a tagger.

Statistics
Updated to the end of the 2022 season.

|-
| scope=row bgcolor=F0E68C | 2017#
|style="text-align:center;"|
| 34 || 5 || 5 || 0 || 30 || 40 || 70 || 9 || 35 || 1.0 || 0.0 || 6.0 || 8.0 || 14.0 || 1.8 || 7.0 || 0
|-
| 2018
|
| 34 || 18 || 6 || 3 || 143 || 107 || 250 || 31 || 107 || 0.3 || 0.2 || 7.9 || 5.9 || 13.9 || 1.7 || 5.9 || 0
|-
! scope="row" style="text-align:center" | 2019
|style="text-align:center;"|
| 34 || 16 || 8 || 3 || 153 || 119 || 272 || 36 || 113 || 0.5 || 0.2 || 9.6 || 7.4 || 17.0 || 2.3 || 7.1 || 1
|-
| scope=row bgcolor=F0E68C | 2020#
|
| 34 || 16 || 2 || 2 || 110 || 130 || 240 || 31 || 72 || 0.1 || 0.1 || 6.9 || 8.1 || 15.0 || 1.9 || 4.5 || 3
|-
| 2021
|
| 34 || 22 || 11 || 7 || 220 || 198 || 418 || 56 || 122 || 0.5 || 0.3 || 10.0 || 9.0 || 19.0 || 2.6 || 5.6 || 3
|-
| 2022
|
| 34 || 20 || 8 || 2 || 186 || 175 || 361 || 57 || 95 || 0.4 || 0.1 || 9.3 || 8.8 || 18.1 || 2.9 || 4.8 || 2
|- class="sortbottom"
! colspan=3| Career
! 97
! 40
! 17
! 842	
! 769	
! 1611
! 220
! 544
! 0.4
! 0.2
! 8.7
! 7.9
! 16.6
! 2.3
! 5.6
! 9
|}

Notes

Honours and achievements
Team
 2x AFL premiership player: 2017, 2020
 McClelland Trophy: 2018

Junior
 Larke Medal: 2016
 Under 18 All-Australian: 2016
 Under 18 South Australia captain: 2016
 Under 16 South Australia captain: 2014

Personal life
Graham's father Jeff Graham played 77 matches with West Torrens and Woodville West-Torrens in the SANFL between 1987 and 1992.

References

External links

 
 
 Jack Graham's profile at AFL Draft Central

Living people
1998 births
Australian rules footballers from South Australia
North Adelaide Football Club players
Richmond Football Club players
Richmond Football Club Premiership players
Two-time VFL/AFL Premiership players